Kuthalam block is a revenue block in the Kuthalam taluk of Mayiladuthurai district, Tamil Nadu, India. There are a total of 51 panchayat villages in this block.

References
 

Revenue blocks of Mayiladuthurai district